Mamedkala (Mammәdkala) is an urban locality (an urban-type settlement) in Derbentsky District of the Republic of Dagestan, Russia. As of the 2010 Census, its population was 11,029.

Administrative and municipal status
Within the framework of administrative divisions, the urban-type settlement of Mamedkala is incorporated within Derbentsky District as Mamedkala Settlement (an administrative division of the district). As a municipal division, Mamedkala Settlement is incorporated within Derbentsky Municipal District as Mamedkala Urban Settlement.

References

Notes

Sources

External links
Unofficial website of Mamedkala 

Urban-type settlements in the Republic of Dagestan
